Dharuhera is a census town located, just 19 km from Rewari city in Rewari district of the state of Haryana, India. Dharuhera comes under Delhi NCR region and it is a big Industrial hub in Rewari District. Dharuhera is the new growth corridor of Gurugram and New Delhi. It is only an hour drive from the Indira Gandhi International Airport and 19 km from Rewari city, the district headquarter, 40 km from Gurugram. It connects Rajasthan to the capital, New Delhi, through the National Highway 48 (formerly NH8). It is a prime choice for industrialists, investors, and real estate developers due to its location.
Dharuhera is located in what is colloquially referred as most prosperous region of Haryana.

Demographics 
 India census, Dharuhera had a population of 30,344.  males constituted 54.09% of the population and females 45.91%. Dharuhera had an average literacy rate of 83.18%, higher than the state average of 75.55% and national average of 74.04%: male literacy was 90.21% and, female literacy was 74.92%. 14.60% of the population was under 6 years of age. , after rapid growth, the population is estimated to be 45,000.
The Scheduled Castes consists of 16.10% of total population of Dharuhera

Villages In Dharuhera Block
Villages in Dharuhera Block, Haryana, India.
Nikhri - Dungarwas - Masani - Rasgan - Jonawas Jaunawas - Bhatsana - Kharkhara - Khatwali - Rajpura Alamgirpur - Dhakia - Malpura - Jauniyawas - Kapdiwas - Garhi-Alawalpur - Maheshwari - Akera - Ghatal Mahaniawas - Khaliawas - Titarpur - Jeetpur Istmurar - Rojhka - Sangwari - Bhudla - Ladhuwas - Salhawas - Kasola - Kasoli - Asiyaki - Panchor - Jarthal - Pachgaon - Sampli

Economy

The economy of Dharuhera was mainly agrarian dominated until recently. Dharuhera industrial estate has provided some employment to the local people. Of late, initiated by an industrial estate developed by the state of Haryana, much of the agricultural land has been developed by real estate developers. As the urbanisation and construction activity extends from Delhi, Dharuhera is now a preferred location for investors in real estate and built properties.

Industries
Dharuhera industrial estate is located on both sides  of NH48 and has many large manufacturing plants such as Hero MotoCorp Ltd. (formerly Hero Honda Motors Ltd.), Jtekt India Ltd. (formerly known as Sona Koyo Steering Systems Ltd.).

Venus Engineers (Opp. Power House) and DELPHI Automotive Systems Pvt. Ltd (a global MNC). Dharuhera also has India’s biggest dairy plant Amul, Carlsberg beer factory, Lumax Industries Ltd., Dharuhera Pharmaceutical Pvt. Ltd., Rico Auto Industries, Sehgal Paper Mills, East India Synthetics, and Indian Oil Corporation.

Real Estate Developers
 Bestech City Plots - the prime project in Dharuhera for effluent residents of the area
 Dwarkadhis Projects Pvt. Ltd.
 Anandam Estate (MG Housing Private Limited)
 Tulip Infratech Pvt. Ltd.
 Vardhman Developers
 The Essentia
 Vipul
 Lotus Green city
 Piyush Horizon
 Avalon Rangoli
 Parsvnath 
 Armada Residency
 Raheja
 Bestech Parkview Delight
 M2K Freedom Apartments
 Dwarkadhis Buildwell Group
Ambition Colonisers Private Limited
Springwoods City

Urban development 
Dharuhera is about a 40-minute drive from Gurgaon and 60 minutes from Indira Gandhi International Airport. Due to its proximity to Gurgaon and New Delhi, Dharuhera had all the makings of the next big satellite city in the region, with a number of developers running projects here, but it has been deprived by the short sightedness of the Haryana Urban Development  Authority (HUDA). The town lacks good public sector healthcare, educational institutes, recreational centres, public spaces, leisure parks, libraries, art galleries, places for performing arts, stadiums, swimming pools, theatres, multiplex (one is coming up at Bestech city), and parking spaces in markets. It even lacks a proper crematorium or burial ground. To be fair to Dharuhera, the town planners in Haryana are generally regarded  as incompetent and have done no damage to their reputation as probably the worst town planners in the country. The town lacks adequate drainage facilities and usually the parts near the NH-48 and Bhiwadi are submerged  even after the slightest rain, due to planning mistakes.  But lack of affordable real estate in National Capital Region has made people overlook these problems and it remains one of the  most promising real estates in not only NCR but the whole of India.= PTRADITION =

See also places 
 Nikhri Village NH-48
 Gurgaon
 Manesar
 Bawal
 Kundli-Manesar-Palwal Expressway
 Pataudi
 Haryana

References 

Dharuhera: Indian state of Haryana and in close proximity to NH8 – one of the busiest national highway of the subcontinent- is growing up to be among the most promising destination : DPL 24 High Street is launched its kind of first Commercial Project in Dharuhera by Dpl Homes adjacent to Casa Romana.

Cities and towns in Rewari district
Rewari